The Little Cypress Creek Brook is a historic bridge in rural western Phillips County, Arkansas.  Located south of the hamlet of Postelle, it carries County Road 600 over Little Cypress Creek, west of Arkansas Highway 39.  It consists of two  spans of an aluminum-beam substructure, resting on concrete abutments and piers, with textured metal deck plating as the road surface.  The bridge was built in 1942, and was probably designed by the engineering staff of the Arkansas State Highway Commission.  It is a well-preserved example of a World War II-era bridge.

The bridge was listed on the National Register of Historic Places in 1995.

See also
 State Highway 274 Bridge: another bridge over the Little Cypress Creek
 National Register of Historic Places listings in Phillips County, Arkansas
 List of bridges on the National Register of Historic Places in Arkansas

References

Road bridges on the National Register of Historic Places in Arkansas
Bridges completed in 1942
1942 establishments in Arkansas
National Register of Historic Places in Phillips County, Arkansas
Beam bridges in the United States
Metal bridges in the United States
Transportation in Phillips County, Arkansas